Basic Law: The Government is a Basic Law of Israel, first legislated in the Sixth Knesset, on 13 August 1968 (Hebrew calendar). It was substituted by an additional Basic Law: The Government of 1992, in the Twelfth Knesset on 18 March 1992, in order to change the electoral system, with the purpose of creating a direct prime ministerial elections system. After concluding the old parliamentary system of government was the best option for the complex composition of the Israeli society, it was once again substituted by an additional Basic Law: The Government of 2001, in the Fifteenth Knesset, on 7 March 2001, in order to cancel the previous additional law of 1992 that had replaced the original law of 1968, and with the purpose of restoring the old parliamentary system.

The basic law determines the composition of the Government, its roles and authorities.

Main provisions (2001)
 5–6: "The Government is composed of a Prime Minister and other ministers.... The Prime Minister shall be a member of the Knesset... A Minister need not be a member of the Knesset [he may be] ...  A Minister must be an Israeli citizen and a resident of Israel."
 7: "When a new Government has to be constituted, the President of the State shall, after consultation with representatives of party groups in the Knesset, assign the task of forming a Government to a Knesset Member who has notified him that he is prepared to accept the task; the President shall do so within seven days of the publication of the election results, or should the need arise to form a new government; and in the case of the death of the Prime Minister, within 14 days of his death."
28: "The Knesset may adopt an expression of no confidence in the Government... An expression of no confidence in the Government will be by a decision adopted by the majority of the Members of Knesset to request that the President assign the task of forming a Government to a certain Knesset member who gave his written consent thereto... If the Knesset has expressed no confidence in the Government, the Government shall be deemed to have resigned."
29: "the Prime Minister... may, with the approval of the President of the State, disperse the Knesset ... and the Government shall be deemed to have resigned."

See also
 Basic Laws of Israel
 Cabinet of Israel

External links
 The Existing Basic Laws: Full Texts, Knesset website 

1968 in Israel
1968 in law
1992 in Israel
1992 in law
2001 in Israel
2001 in law
Government
Government of Israel
Politics of Israel
6th Knesset (1965–1969)
12th Knesset (1988–1992)
15th Knesset (1999–2003)